The Old Schoolhouse, also known as the York Corner Schoolhouse, is an historic one-room school building on the grounds of the Old York Historical Society at York and Lindsay Streets in York, Maine.  Built in 1755, it is one of the oldest surviving schoolhouses in all of New England.  It was listed on the National Register of Historic Places in 1973.

Description and history
The Old Schoolhouse is located on the west side of Lindsay Street a short way south of its junction with York Street (United States Route 1A), just outside the center of the village of York.  It stands adjacent to the Jefferds Tavern and the visitor center of the Old York Historical Society, which stands at the street corner.  The schoolhouse is a small wood frame structure with a gable roof covered in wooden shingles, with exterior walls clad in clapboards.  The interior is quite plain, with wide hand-planed floorboards, a fireplace at one end, a small section of plastered wall, and a few small windows.

This schoolhouse was built in 1755 in the York Corner area to provide schooling for that area's children.  The building's window openings were originally covered in oiled paper, which would have provided a limited amount of daylight.  (The interior is currently lit by electric lights added by the museum.)  It was rescued from demolition by the museum, its previous use having been as a chicken coop.

See also
National Register of Historic Places listings in York County, Maine

References

External links
 Museums of Old York

School buildings on the National Register of Historic Places in Maine
School buildings completed in 1755
Schools in York County, Maine
Buildings and structures in York, Maine
Defunct schools in Maine
Museums in York County, Maine
Education museums in the United States
One-room schoolhouses in Maine
National Register of Historic Places in York County, Maine
Historic district contributing properties in Maine